{{DISPLAYTITLE:General mn-type image filter}}

These filters are electrical wave filters designed using the image method.  They are an invention of Otto Zobel at AT&T Corp.  They are a generalisation of the m-type filter in that a transform is applied that modifies the transfer function while keeping the image impedance unchanged.  For filters that have only one stopband there is no distinction with the m-type filter.  However, for a filter that has multiple stopbands, there is the possibility that the form of the transfer function in each stopband can be different.  For instance, it may be required to filter one band with the sharpest possible cut-off, but in another to minimise phase distortion while still achieving some attenuation.  If the form is identical at each transition from passband to stopband the filter will be the same as an  m-type filter (k-type filter in the limiting case of m=1).  If they are different, then the general case described here pertains.

The k-type filter acts as a prototype for producing the general mn designs.  For any given desired bandform there are two classes of mn transformation that can be applied, namely, the mid-series and mid-shunt derived sections; this terminology being more fully explained in the m-derived filter article.  Another feature of m-type filters that also applies in the general case is that a half section will have the original k-type image impedance on one side only.  The other port will present a new image impedance.  The two transformations have equivalent transfer functions but different image impedances and circuit topology.

Mid-series multiple stopband

If Z and Y are the series impedance and shunt admittance of a constant k half section and;

where Z1, Z2 etc are a cascade of antiresonators,

the transformed series impedance for a mid-series derived filter becomes;

Where the mn are arbitrary positive coefficients.  For an invariant image impedance ZiT and invariant bandform (that is, invariant cut-off frequencies ωc) the transformed shunt admittance, expressed in terms of Zmn, is given by;

where  and is a constant by definition.  When the mn are all equal this reduces to the expression for an m-type filter and where they are all equal to one it reduces further to the k-type filter.

A result of this relationship is that the N antiresonators in Zmn will transform into 2N resonators in Ymn.  The coefficients mn can be adjusted by the designer to set the frequency of one of the two poles of attenuation, ω∞, in each stopband.  The second pole of attenuation is dependent and cannot be set separately.

Special cases

In the case of a filter with a stopband extending to zero frequency, one of the antiresonators in Z will reduce to a single inductor.  In this case the resonators in Ymn are reduced by one to 2N-1.  Similarly, for a filter with a stopband extending to infinity, one antiresonator will reduce to a single capacitor and the resonators will again be reduced by one.  In a filter where both conditions pertain, the number of resonators will be 2N-2.  For these end stopbands, there is only one pole of attenuation in each, as would be expected from the reduced number of resonators.  These forms are the maximum allowable complexity while maintaining invariance of bandform and one image impedance.

Mid-shunt multiple stopband

By dual analogy, the shunt derived filter starts from;

For an invariant image admittance YiΠ and invariant bandform the transformed series impedance is given by;

Simple bandpass section

The bandpass filter can be characterised as a 2-bandstop filter with ωc = 0 for the lower critical frequency of the lower band  and ωc = ∞ for the upper critical frequency of the upper band.  The two resonators reduce to an inductor and a capacitor respectively.  The number of antiresonators reduces to two.

If, however, ω∞1 is set to zero (that is, there is no pole of attenuation in the lower stopband) and ω∞2 is set to correspond to the upper critical frequency ωc1, then a particularly simple form of the bandpass filter is obtained consisting of just antiresonators coupled by capacitors.  This was a popular topology for multi-section band-pass filters due its low component count, particularly of inductors.  Many other such reduced forms are possible by setting one of the poles of attenuation to correspond to one of the critical frequencies for various classes of basic filter.

See also

Image impedance
Constant k filter
m-derived filter
mm'-type filter
Composite image filter

Notes

References
 Zobel, O. J.,Theory and Design of Uniform and Composite Electric Wave Filters, Bell System Technical Journal, Vol. 2 (1923), pp. 1-46.
 Mathaei, Young, Jones Microwave Filters, Impedance-Matching Networks, and Coupling Structures McGraw-Hill 1964.
 Bray, J, Innovation and the Communications Revolution, Institution of Electrical Engineers, 2002 

Image impedance filters
Electronic filter topology